Ernest de Sylly Hamilton Browne (11 July 1855 – 13 April 1946; also E. de S. H. Browne) was an Irish tennis player who was active in the late 19th century.

Career
Browne played his first tournament in April at 1880 at a tournament staged in Cheltenham on clay he reached the final before losing to Ernest Renshaw. In late May 1880 he entered the Irish Lawn Tennis Championships and reached the All-Comers final losing  to William Renshaw in straight sets. In 1881 he entered three tournaments this year including the South of England Championships losing in the 1st round. At Irish Championships he lost a second match against Herbert Lawford retiring at two sets to one down. He reached his second successive Cheltenham final in 1881 before losing to William Renshaw. Browne took part in the Wimbledon Championships between 1882 and 1885. In 1885 he reached the semifinals of the all-comers-competition, but lost to Ernest Renshaw. He won the Irish Championships in doubles (1882) and mixed doubles (1882, 1883) the Scottish Championships singles title consecutively three times from (1889–91). and the Welsh Championships singles title twice (1886–87). In addition he won three consecutive West of England Championships, (1883,84,85) titles at Bath and the Cheltenham tournament singles title four times, (1881, 1885–87). Browne was a friend and mentor of Ernest and William Renshaw. He played his last tournament at the 1892 Scottish Championships where he was defending in the challenge round against challenger Arthur Gore he conceded the title by a walkover.

Personal
Ernest was born in 1855 in England. He married Ellen Augusta Ramsay the daughter of Sir Alexander Ramsay in Kensington London in December 1885. After his retirement he resided in Tullamore, King's County, Ireland. He spent his final years in England and died in Cheltenham England in 1946 at the age of 90.

Career Finals
Notes: Challenge Round: the final round of a tournament, in which the winner of a single-elimination phase faces the previous year's champion, who plays only that one match. The challenge round was used in the early history of tennis (from 1877 through 1921), in some tournaments not all.

Singles: 32 (22 titles, 10 runner-up)
Incomplete Roll

References

Sources
 
  Myers, Arthur Wallis (1903): Lawn Tennis at Home and Abroad. Charles Scribner's and Sons, New York, US.

External links
 https://www.freebmd.org.uk/brith/marriages/deaths register 1946

British male tennis players
Irish male tennis players
1855 births
1946 deaths
19th-century male tennis players
Tennis people from Worcestershire